Cheghalu (also Romanized as Cheghālū) is a village in Leylan-e Jonubi Rural District, Leylan District, Malekan County, East Azerbaijan Province, Iran. At the 2006 census, its population was 485, in 115 families.

References 

Populated places in Malekan County